State Route 289 (SR 289) is a  route that serves as a connection between both SR 5/183 and SR 14 within Marion in Perry County. It is known as Washington Street and Fikes Ferry Access for its entire length.

Route description
The southern terminus of SR 289 is located at its junction with SR 5 and SR 183 in southern Marion. The route then takes a generally northward track along Fikes Ferry Access before curving to the west and coming to an intersection with Washington Street, where it turns north again to its northern terminus at SR 14 in the central business district of Marion.

Major intersections

References

External links

289
Transportation in Perry County, Alabama